Swathi Muthyam is a 2022 Indian Telugu-language comedy drama film written and directed by Lakshman K Krishna. The film features Bellamkonda Ganesh (in his debut) and Varsha Bollamma. The film revolves around dramatic life of an innocent boy, Bala.

Plot 

A young man, Bala Murali Krishna works as a government employee. He is innocent and pure at heart. His family starts searching a bride for him.One of those matches is Bhagyalakshmi aka Bhagi(Varsha). They met in a coffee shop, She tells that she needs some time to decide about their marriage.To  understand better about each other they started meeting frequently, slowly they fell in love and Bhagi agrees to marry Bala.

On the wedding day he got a phone call from his office, He is shocked to see Sailaja(Divya ) at his office. Few months back Bala donated his sperms for an illegal surrogacy for a lady in Dubai. Sailaja is the one who carried surrogacy and gave birth to a baby. She informed him that the lady died and no one is responding about that.

Bala takes her to his marriage. She overhears Bala and his friend Bucchi babu conversation and misunderstands him and leaves the marriage leaving the baby with Bala. Everyone at marriage thinks that the baby in Bala's hands is his baby and he had an affair with Sailaja. Due to these misunderstandings his marriage gets cancelled. He takes care of that baby. Bhagi comes to know about that surrogacy issue and understand that Bala is innocent. Her parents find another match for her. She goes to hospital to do female sterilization(surgical procedure to prevent pregnancy permanently). Upon knowing this Bala comes to the hospital at the same time Bucchi babu and  Sailaja come to the same place to clear misunderstandings between Bala and his family. 

Finally Bala and Bhagi's families understand their love and his innocence and agree to their marriage.

Cast 

 Bellamkonda Ganesh as Bala Murali Krishna
 Varsha Bollamma as Bhagyalakshmi alias Bhagi 
 Vennela Kishore as Dr. Bucchi Babu, Bala's bestfriend 
 Rao Ramesh as Venkatrao, Bala's father
 Pragathi as Bala's mother
 Naresh as Hanumantha Rao, Bhagi's father
 Surekha Vani as Bhagi's mother
 Goparaju Ramana as Bhagi's uncle
 Divya Sripada as Sailaja
 Subbaraju as Bala's office EO
 Harshavardhan as Dr. Daiva Prasad
 Sivannarayana Naripeddi as Daniel, Bala's colleague
 Bindu as Srilakshmi, Bala's colleague
 Pammi Sai as Govindam, Bala's assistant
 Sunaina as Bucchi Babu's wife
 Pawan Bolisetty as Vasu, Bala's brother
 Ananth Babu as marriage broker
 Rajitha as gynaecologist 
 Viva Raghav as Bala's friend
 Satish Saripalli

Release and reception  
The film was initially scheduled to release on 13 August 2022.

A critic from The Times of India wrote that the film "relies heavily on its situational humour but fails to engage midway because of its thin plot. Nevertheless, give it a try for its humour". A critic from 123telugu said that "On the whole, Swathi Muthyam is a simple family drama with comedy being its main asset". A critic from Pinkvilla said that "Situational comedy can't save this superficial family entertainer".

Eenadu critic appreciated the story and performances while criticizing the direction and execution. On the technical aspects, Thummala Mohan of Samayam Telugu wrote, " ."

References

External links 

 

2022 films
2020s Telugu-language films
Indian comedy-drama films
2022 comedy-drama films
Films shot in Hyderabad, India
Films set in Andhra Pradesh
Films shot in Andhra Pradesh